is a Japanese girl group, founded by Tsunku in 2007 within his Nice Girl Project!.

The group debuted in 2007 with the single "SWEET & TOUGHNESS" as a nine-member group. After two albums, six singles and various line-up changes between 2007 and 2011, Canary Club was transferred to Space Craft Group in 2011 with all members transferring except for Chihira Mochida, who remained a member of the group under TNX until her departure from the label in January 2015.. Since transferring, Canary Club have released songs for the game Rhythm Heaven in 2011.

In a blog post discussing her departure, Chihara Mochida revealed that Canary Club went on hiatus in May 2012 to focus on individual activities.

Members 
Can's (subunit)
 , born 
 , born 

Aries (subunit)
 , born 
 , born

Former members 
 Can's
 , born  — left in January 2009
 , born  — left in June 2009

 Aries
 , born  — left in March 2010
 , born  — left in May 2011
 , born  — left in May 2011

 Subunit unknown
 , born  — joined in late 2009, left in January 2015

Discography

Singles 

 DVD singles

Albums

DVDs

References

External links 
 
 Official blog 
 Canary Club "Ishin-denshin" No. 37 on TBS Radio

Japanese musical groups
Japanese girl groups
Japanese idol groups
Musical groups established in 2007
Nice Girl Project!
2007 establishments in Japan